Kingini is a 1992 Indian Malayalam film, directed by A. N. Thampi, starring Prem Kumar and Ranjini in the lead roles.

Cast

 Ashokan as Baiju Prakash
 Jagathy Sreekumar as Nayappi
 Nedumudi Venu as Somadathan Namboothiri
 Prem Kumar as Luke Mathew 
 Jagannatha Varma as Valiya Thirumeni
 Jagannathan as Thirumeni
 Kamalroy as Mahesh
 Kunchan as Chandi Thomas
 Mamukkoya as Kuttappan 
 Ranjini as Nandini
 Aranmula Ponnamma as Mahesh's grandmother
 Innocent as Govindan
 Thodupuzha Vasanthi as Kalyani
 Sreelatha as college student
 Sasikala as Kingini's mother
 Sujatha as Kingini

Soundtrack
Music was by Kannur Rajan, with lyrics by Bichu Thirumala, Mayooram Thankappan Nair, A. N. Thambi. The background score of this film was done by Darshan Raman. Recordist is Irshad Hussain at Chithranjali Studio, Thiruvananthapuram.

 "Kurinjippoove" - Ashalatha
 "Kurinjippoove" (Pathos) - Ashalatha
 "Maanasalola Marathaka Varna" - K. J. Yesudas
 "Malar Chorum" - Kanjangad Ramachandran
 "Mounam Polum" - K. J. Yesudas

References

External links

1992 films
1990s Malayalam-language films